The 1983 Dacorum Borough Council election took place on 5 May 1983 to elect members of the Dacorum Borough Council in England. It was held on the same day as other local elections.

Election result

|}

References

1983 English local elections
May 1983 events in the United Kingdom
1983
1980s in Hertfordshire